Gemma Hussey (born 11 November 1938) is an Irish former Fine Gael politician who served as Minister for Social Welfare from 1986 to 1987, Minister for Labour from January 1987 to March 1987, Minister for Education from 1982 to 1986, Leader of the Seanad and Leader of Fine Gael in the Seanad from 1981 to 1982. She served as a Teachta Dála (TD) for the Wicklow constituency from 1982 to 1989. She also served as a Senator for the National University from 1977 to 1982.

Early life
Hussey was born in Bray, County Wicklow, in 1938. She was educated at Loreto College, Foxrock and at University College Dublin. Hussey had a successful career running a language school in the late 1960s and 1970s. She married Derry Hussey in 1976, and they had 3 children. Derry Hussey died in 2020.

Political career

Senator
She was elected by the National University to Seanad Éireann, serving in the upper house of the Oireachtas, from 1977 until 1982. She sat as an Independent Senator for the first three years, before joining Fine Gael. She then served as Fine Gael Seanad Spokesperson on Women's Affairs from 1981 to 1982. She went on to be the party leader in the Seanad and leader of the Seanad from 1981 to 1982.

TD and Minister
She was first elected to Dáil Éireann on her second attempt, at the February 1982 general election, as a Fine Gael TD for Wicklow.

Hussey served as Minister for Education in the Fine Gael–Labour Party coalition government of Taoiseach Garret FitzGerald from 1982 to 1986, during which time she was heavily criticised by teachers' unions during a bitter pay strike in 1984. The 1980s was a decade of economic crisis and the government was faced with challenges caused by the precarious state of the public finances. This meant that she had to find ways to reduce the Education budget. One of her measures was to introduce charges for the school transport system, which proved unpopular. However, third-level enrolments were increasing rapidly and Hussey secured increased funding for higher education at a time of severe spending cutbacks. In 1986, she became Minister for Social Welfare. FitzGerald considered creating a new ministry for Hussey as Minister for EEC affairs. However, she did not wish to compete with the Department of Foreign Affairs, and so declined the position.
Always a liberal and a feminist, she took a strongly supportive position on the legalisation of divorce, which was defeated in a referendum in 1986, and frequently suggested that she supported the liberalisation of Ireland's abortion ban. A member of Fine Gael's liberal wing, which included Monica Barnes, Nuala Fennell, Alan Shatter and Alan Dukes, she was disliked by the conservative wing of the party which included TDs like Oliver J. Flanagan, Alice Glenn and Gerry L'Estrange.

During a meeting with Keith Joseph, British Secretary of State for Education, Joseph boasted to Hussey that he held surgeries once a month, which was considered a high number in Britain. Hussey responded that she had to do clinics three days every week to hold on to her seat as a TD.

The book of her cabinet diaries, At the Cutting Edge, published in 1990, was hailed as the most thorough and realistic account of life inside the cabinet in Ireland. She retired from politics at the 1989 general election.

In 1990, she was sharply criticised within her party for suggesting that she might support the Labour Party presidential candidate, Mary Robinson, a feminist, over the official Fine Gael candidate Austin Currie. Mary Robinson went on to become Ireland's first female President.

An enthusiastic Europhile, Hussey spends a lot of her time now promoting the advancement of women in politics around the European Union.

In the lead-up to the 1997 presidential election, Hussey was mentioned as a possible Fine Gael candidate, and was predicted to do well across Dublin and in her native Wicklow constituency and among supporters of Fine Gael and of the Progressive Democrats. In the event the party nomination went to Mary Banotti, who lost heavily to Mary McAleese in the election.

References

Bibliography
Hussey, Gemma: At the Cutting Edge: Cabinet Diaries, 1982–1987 (Dublin, 1990)
Hussey, Gemma: Ireland Today: Anatomy of a Changing State (London, 1993)

1938 births
Living people
Alumni of University College Dublin
Fine Gael TDs
Fine Gael senators
Independent members of Seanad Éireann
Members of Seanad Éireann for the National University of Ireland
Members of the 14th Seanad
Members of the 15th Seanad
20th-century women members of Seanad Éireann
Members of the 23rd Dáil
Members of the 24th Dáil
Members of the 25th Dáil
20th-century women Teachtaí Dála
Ministers for Education (Ireland)
Ministers for Social Affairs (Ireland)
Politicians from County Dublin
Presidential appointees to the Council of State (Ireland)
Women government ministers of the Republic of Ireland
People educated at Loreto College, Foxrock